The Gregory Peck Award for Cinematic Excellence is an award given at the San Diego International Film Festival (SDIFF) to honor the career achievement of a film actor, producer or director. It is named in memory of iconic actor Gregory Peck with the support of his family.

The award is SDIFF's most prestigious award and headlining presentation at their fanciest formal event Variety's Night of the Stars.

History 
The award originated in 2008 at the Dingle International Film Festival (DIFF)  in Ireland with the support and participation of Pecks' family, who chose Dingle  because it is the ancestral home of the actor's great-grandmother Catherine Ashe who hailed from Annascaul in the Dingle Peninsula. Its original name was the "Gregory Peck Excellence in the Art of Film Award."

In 2014, the family began presenting the award in San Diego where the actor was born, raised his family and where he founded the La Jolla Playhouse.  Since the DIFF was forced to close due to financial reasons in 2019, the award is presented exclusively at SDIFF.

Trophies 
Winners in Dingle were awarded with a design based on "The Aglish Pillar" created by Irish Jeweller Brian de Staic. Winners in San Diego have received a "Golden Eagle Statuette" sculpted by Apache artist Ruben Chato.

Honorees

See also 

 List of San Diego International Film Festival award winners

References

External links 

GregoryPeck.com
San Diego International Film Festival
Dingle International Film Festival

International film awards
American film awards
Lists of films by award
Awards established in 2008